Maejeon-myeon is a myeon, or township, in Cheongdo County, Gyeongsangbuk-do, South Korea. Maejeon is home to two elementary schools and Maejeon Middle School.

Maejeon is well known for producing seedless persimmons, jujubees and hapyeong ginkgo. Tourists from neighboring counties like to visit the Cheongdo Bansi Agricultural Experience, where they can pick persimmons and jujubes.

Cheongdo County
Towns and townships in North Gyeongsang Province